George Warren was a member of the Wisconsin State Assembly in 1883, representing the 2nd District of Waupaca County, Wisconsin. He was a Democrat. Warren was born on June 28, 1828, in Lexington, New York.

References

People from Greene County, New York
People from Waupaca County, Wisconsin
1828 births
Year of death missing
Democratic Party members of the Wisconsin State Assembly